Promanus depressus is a species of beetles of the family Lophocateridae, endemic to New Zealand.

References

Beetles of New Zealand
Beetles described in 1877